Théodore Abada (23 July 1889 – 2 December 1974) was a French racing cyclist. He rode in the 1920 Tour de France.

References

1889 births
1974 deaths
French male cyclists